Benedicta Boccoli (born 11 November 1966) is an Italian theater and movie actress.

Biography 

Born in Milan on 11 November 1966 she moved to Rome with her family as a child. Her sister Brigitta is an actress, as well. She has also two brothers: Barnaby and Filippo.

Known as an eclectic and versatile actress, she had her debut in television at a very early age (18 years). A few years later, she discovered that working in theater was where she truly belonged as an actress.

Actor and director Giorgio Albertazzi nicknamed her the Artistissima (the uber artist) because of her outstanding performances. She has also received favorable reviews in newspapers such as Corriere della Sera, la Repubblica, The Press, Time and La Gazzetta del Mezzogiorno.

Every Monday, she writes on Il Fatto Quotidiano, the heading Cosa resterà: it's the diary of a teen-ager of years '80/'90.

Career highlights

Film 
Gli angeli di Borsellino, director Rocco Cesareo – 2003
Valzer, director Salvatore Maira – 2007
Pietralata, director Gianni Leacche – 2008
Ciao Brother, director Nicola Barnaba – 2016

Short film 

La confessione, director herself – 2020;

Come un fiore, director herself – 2023, on raising awareness for breast cancer prevention and body acceptance;

Theater 

Blithe Spirit of Noël Coward, with Ugo Pagliai and Paola Gassman – 1992/1993 –
Cantando Cantando of Maurizio Micheli, with Maurizio Micheli, Aldo Ralli and Gianluca Guidi – 1994/1995 –
Buonanotte Bettina, of Pietro Garinei e Sandro Giovannini, with Maurizio Micheli and Miranda Martino - 1995/1996/1997 –
Can-Can – Musical of Abe Burrows, 1998/1999 –
Orfeo all'inferno – Opera di Jacques Offenbach – 1999 – acting Tersicore
Polvere di stelle, 2000/2001/2002
Le Pillole d'Ercole of Maurice Hennequin and Paul Bilhaud, with Maurizio Micheli, dir. Maurizio Nichetti -  2002/2003/2004
Anfitrione, of Plautus, with Maurizio Micheli, dir Michele Mirabella - 2004
Stalker of Rebecca Gillmann, dir Marcello Cotugno - 2004
Plutus of Aristofanes, with Maurizio Micheli, dir Michele Mirabella - 2004
Cactus flower of Pierre Barillet and Jean-Pierre Grédy, with Edoardo Siravo, dir Tonino Pulci - 2004/2005/2006
Prova a farmi ridere of Alan Aykbourn, with Pino Quartullo, dir. Maurizio Micheli - 2006
The Tempest of William Shakespeare, – 2006 – Ariel
Sunshine of William Mastrosimone, directed by Giorgio Albertazzi, 2007/2008
L'Appartamento, of Billy Wilder, 2009–2010
Il marito scornato (Georges Dandin), of Molière, 2011
Vite private, of Noël Coward, with Corrado Tedeschi – 2012–2013
 Dis-order, of Neil LaBute, dir. Marcello Cotugno, with Claudio Botosso – 2014
 Incubi d'Amore, of Augusto Fornari, Toni Fornari, Andrea Maia, Vincenzo Sinopoli, dir. Augusto Fornari, with Sebastiano Somma and Morgana Forcella – 2014
 Crimini del Cuore, of Beth Henley, dir. Marco Mattolini – 2015
 A Room with a View, of E. M. Forster, dir. Stefano Artissunch – 2016
 Cactus Flower of Pierre Barillet and Jean-Pierre Gredy, dir Piergiorgio Piccoli and Aristide Genovese - 2016
 Il più brutto week-end della nostra vita of Norm Foster, dir. Maurizio Micheli - 2017-2018
 The test of Jordi Vallejo, dir.  - 2019–2020-2021-2022-2023;
 Su con la vita of Maurizio Micheli, dir. Maurizio Micheli - 2020;
 Les Précieuses ridicules free taken from Molière, dir. Stefano Artissunch, with Lorenza Mario and Stefano Artissunch - 2023;

Television 

Pronto, chi gioca?, directed by Gianni Boncompagni
Domenica In – with her sister Brigitta Boccoli from 1987 to 1990
Viva Colombo inclosed in Il sabato sera di Rai Uno - 1991
Gelato al limone – with Massimiliano Pani
Unomattina – 1994
Due come noi – Co-starring with Wilma De Angelis – 1997
Incantesimo
Reality Circus – Reality show 2006/2007

Fotogallery

References

External links 

1966 births
Living people
Actresses from Rome
Actresses from Milan
Italian television actresses
Italian film actresses
Italian stage actresses
20th-century Italian actresses
21st-century Italian actresses